Exodeoxyribonuclease (phage SP3-induced) (EC 3.1.11.4, phage SP3 DNase, DNA 5′-dinucleotidohydrolase, deoxyribonucleate 5′-dinucleotidase, deoxyribonucleic 5′-dinucleotidohydrolase, bacteriophage SP3 deoxyribonuclease) is an enzyme. that catalyses the following chemical reaction

 Exonucleolytic cleavage in the 5′- to 3′-direction to yield nucleoside 5′-phosphates

Preference for single-stranded DNA.

References

External links 
 

EC 3.1.11
Phage proteins